Alnair is a traditional name for two different stars:

 Alpha Gruis, a star in Grus
 Zeta Centauri, a star in Centaurus